Two ships of the United States Navy have been named Carmita.

 , formerly Slate, was acquired by the Navy and placed in service on 11 May 1944.

Sources
 

United States Navy ship names